Richard Webster Leche (May 17, 1898 – February 22, 1965) was an American attorney, judge, and politician, elected as the 44th Governor of the U.S. state of Louisiana. He served from 1936 until 1939, when he resigned. Convicted on federal charges of misuse of federal funds, Leche was the first Louisiana chief executive to be imprisoned.

Background 
Richard Webster Leche was born in New Orleans, the son of Eustace Leche, a salesman, and the former Stella Eloise (Richard), a teacher.  After attending local schools and graduating from Warren Easton High School, Leche entered Tulane University in 1916.  His studies were interrupted when he enlisted in the United States Army as the U.S. entered the First World War.  After being discharged without having seen combat, Leche briefly moved to Chicago, where he sold automobile parts.

He returned to Louisiana, where he studied law and graduated from Loyola University Law School. He passed the bar and started a law practice in 1923.

In 1928, Leche ran unsuccessfully for the Louisiana State Senate. By 1930, Leche had joined with Governor Huey Pierce Long, Jr., and managed Long's campaign for the United States Senate in the fall of that year.  When Long was elected to the Senate in 1932, he appointed Leche as secretary to Oscar K. Allen, who had succeeded him as governor. Leche's job was to keep an eye on Allen and report back to Long on a daily basis. In 1934, Long gained appointment of Leche as a state appeals court judge in New Orleans.

Leche as governor 
After Huey Long was assassinated in September 1935, the Long organization was left without a leader and without a candidate for the 1936 gubernatorial election.  During a period of backroom maneuvering, Longite leaders chose the relatively minor Leche as a compromise candidate. The prominent leaders were New Orleans mayor Robert Maestri, outgoing governor Oscar K. Allen, James A. Noe, Seymour Weiss, and Abe Shushan. Despite his relative obscurity, Leche beat the anti-Long candidate Cleveland Dear, a U.S. representative from Alexandria, with the aid of the still-powerful Long machine. Leche polled 67 percent of the primary vote, and the anti-Long forces seemed beyond recovery. Outgoing State Representative Mason Spencer of Madison, who had uncannily predicted Long's bloody death some five months before it happened, withdrew as a gubernatorial candidate to support Dear, but he still polled nearly two thousand votes because his exodus came too late to remove his name from the ballot. (In this period, most African Americans were still prevented from voting by state barriers to voter registration, so the only competitive politics took place within the Democratic party.)

Upon taking office during the Great Depression, Leche outlined a 26-point plan of improvement for his state, including a vow to continue most Long programs. He proposed a tax on soft drinks, a $2,000 homestead exemption, extending the homestead exemption to surviving spouses and widows, keeping public payrolls at the maximum to reduce unemployment, and establishing of a state department of industry and commerce.

Within four years, however, the scandalous corruption of the Leche administration, "the self-appointed heirs" to Huey Long, was replaced by the "reform" candidate, Sam Houston Jones of Lake Charles.

While Leche continued Long's program of road-building, free textbooks, and expansion of hospital and educational facilities, he and his administration were far less committed to wealth redistribution and social programs. He ceased attacks on the oil industry, granted tax exemptions to new business and industry, and enacted a regressive sales tax. These policies brought Leche support from the press and the business community, two of Huey Long's staunchest foes.

Shortly after his inauguration, Leche commented, "When I took the oath of office I didn't take any vow of poverty."  Corruption was to become the major feature of his administration. It also reached deep into the administration of Louisiana State University, where President James Monroe Smith, called by students "Jimmy the Stooge", was forced from the lucrative position through the "Hayride" scandal.

In a reconciliation with the administration of President Franklin Delano Roosevelt, Leche promised to cease using Long's Share Our Wealth rhetoric and to support New Deal programs. In return, Roosevelt dropped investigation of the Long machine on tax evasion charges and restored federal patronage to Louisiana. The resulting flow of federal funds, accompanied with widespread graft and corruption, became dubbed the "Second Louisiana Purchase" by contemporaries.  While some of the federal funds were from the Public Works Administration to construct new buildings at Louisiana State University and expand New Orleans's Charity Hospital, Leche and his administration took their rapprochement with Roosevelt as free license to steal as much as possible.  Once the corruption became too blatant, though, Leche and several of his cronies, including Superintendent of Construction George Caldwell and President James Monroe Smith at LSU, were indicted in what were termed the "Louisiana Scandals" in 1939.  Beset by scandal and accusations, Leche resigned the governorship on June 26, 1939; he was succeeded by his lieutenant governor, Earl Kemp Long.

Richard Leche's legal problems began when Chester Martin, a highway engineer who had his pay skimmed by Leche's newspaper, mimeographed receipts of the payments and a written summary of his allegations. He left them on the desks of every state legislator the morning before the legislature came into session. Martin lost his job that day, and no one in the state would hire him until the federal government indicted Leche. Martin used the year to get his law degree from LSU, and practiced law until his retirement.

Conviction and imprisonment 

Resignation did not end Leche's legal troubles.  In 1940, he was convicted of using the mails to defraud; the particulars involved a scheme to sell trucks to the state highway department.  Other charges included the use of stolen WPA resources to build private homes for himself and his allies, making a profit from the sale of "hot oil"—oil produced illegally in excess of state quotas and thus exempt from taxation—and misuse of the funds of Louisiana State University.  Huey Long's prediction—"If those fellows ever try to use the powers I've given them without me to hold them down; they'll all land in the penitentiary"—proved prophetic.

Later years
Sentenced to ten years in the United States Penitentiary, Atlanta, Leche was released on parole in 1945. He was pardoned in 1953 by President Harry Truman.  Leche resumed his law practice in New Orleans and worked until his death in 1965.

Legacy
A large medallion at Southeastern Louisiana University's Strawberry Stadium commemorates the life and career of Richard W. Leche.  (The medallion can be viewed on the north exterior end of the east side of the campus football stadium.)

Decades after Leche's conviction, Edwin Edwards was the second governor of Louisiana to be sentenced to prison.

See also
List of people pardoned or granted clemency by the president of the United States

References

 Davis, Edwin Adams. Louisiana: The Pelican State. Baton Rouge: Louisiana State University Press, 1961. LCCN 59:9008.
 Dawson, Joseph G., Ed.  The Louisiana Governors. LSU Press, 1990.
 Sindler, Allan P.  Huey Long's Louisiana: State Politics, 1920–1952. Johns Hopkins, 1956.

External links

 State of Louisiana - Biography
 Cemetery Memorial by La-Cemeteries

1898 births
1965 deaths
Burials at Metairie Cemetery
Democratic Party governors of Louisiana
Louisiana state court judges
Loyola University New Orleans alumni
Politicians from New Orleans
Politicians convicted of mail and wire fraud
Recipients of American presidential pardons
Southeastern Louisiana University
United States Army soldiers
Lawyers from New Orleans
Louisiana politicians convicted of crimes
Military personnel from Louisiana
20th-century American judges
20th-century American lawyers